Holubia is the scientific name of two genera of organisms and may refer to:

Holubia (beetle), a genus of insects in the family Buprestidae
Holubia (plant), a genus of plants in the family Pedaliaceae